The land equivalent ratio is a concept in agriculture that describes the relative land area required under sole cropping (monoculture) to produce the same yield as under intercropping (polyculture).

Definition 

The FAO defines land equivalent ratio (LER) as: 

For a scenario where a total of  crops are intercropped, the land equivalent ratio LER can be calculated as

Example calculation 

The table in this section provides yield values for a hypothetical scenario intercropping a grain crop with a fruit tree crop.

The first two columns state the yields for intercropping (IY) and sole yields (SY). 
The third column, equivalent area, column calculates the area of sole cropping land required to achieve the same yield as 1 ha of intercropping, at the same management level.

The land equivalent ration can be calculated as 

An interpretation of this result would be that a total of 1.4 ha of sole cropping area would be required to produce the same yields as 1 ha of the intercropped system.

Applications 

The land equivalent ratio can be used whenever more than one type of yield can be obtained from the same area. This can be intercropping of annual crops (e.g. sorghum and pigeonpea) or combination of annual and perennial crops e.g. in agroforestry systems (e.g. jackfruit and eggplant).

It is also possible to calculate LERs for combinations of plant and non-plant yields, e.g. in agrivoltaic systems.

The table below lists some examples for land equivalent ratios published in scientific journals:

References 

Sustainability metrics and indices